The 1988 World Sambo Championships were held in Montreal, Quebec, Canada on December 1988. Championships were organized by FIAS.

Medal overview 

note: Medal table isn't complete.

External links 
Results on Sambo.net.ua (with typos)

World Sambo Championships
1988 in sambo (martial art)
Sports competitions in Montreal